The Sound of Jura is a strait in Argyll and Bute, Scotland. It is one of the several Sounds of Scotland.

It is to the east of the island of Jura and to the west of Knapdale, part of a peninsula of the Scottish mainland. The Crinan Canal's west exit is also in the Sound of Jura. Lochs that lead to the sound include Loch Sween, and Loch Caolisport (Loch Killisport).

The north end is particularly treacherous, being filled with skerries, small islands, strong tidal currents and whirlpools. The Gulf of Corryvreckan, which contains a notorious whirlpool, the world's third largest, leads from the north of the sound.

The south end, in contrast, is much wider and more open; most of the small islands and reefs are close into shore. The ferries to Colonsay and Islay from the mainland skirt the southern end of the sound.

Most of Jura's small population lives on the east coast, overlooking the sound. Intermittently between 1946 and 1949, George Orwell lived in Barnhill, a farmhouse on the northeast of the island, when he completed his novel Nineteen Eighty-Four.

It is not to be confused with the Sound of Islay, which lies between Jura and Islay.

References

External links

Landforms of Argyll and Bute
Straits of Scotland
Jura, Scotland